Aleksandrs Prokopčuks (born 2 May 1967) is a Latvian long-distance runner. He competed in the men's marathon at the 1996 Summer Olympics, finishing in 51st place in 2:21:50.  He won the Riga Marathon in 1993 and 1996.

References

External links
 

1967 births
Living people
Athletes (track and field) at the 1996 Summer Olympics
Latvian male long-distance runners
Latvian male marathon runners
Olympic athletes of Latvia
Athletes from Riga